A cassette deck is a type of tape machine for playing and recording audio cassettes that does not have a built-in power amplifier or speakers, and serves primarily as a transport. It can be a part of an automotive entertainment system, a part of a portable mini system or a part of a home component system. In the latter case it is also called a component cassette deck or just a component deck.

A "tape recorder" is a more generic term to identify a device that usually has a self-contained power amplifier and either has a built-in speaker or comes packaged with one.

History

Origins 

The first consumer tape recorder to employ a tape reel permanently housed in a small removable cartridge was the RCA tape cartridge, which appeared in 1958 as a predecessor to the cassette format. At that time, reel to reel recorders and players were commonly used by enthusiasts, but required large individual reels and tapes which had to be threaded by hand, making them less-accessible to the casual consumer. Both RCA and Bell Sound attempted to commercialize the cartridge format, but a few factors stalled adoption, including lower-than-advertised availability of selections in the prerecorded media catalog, delays in production setup, and a stand-alone design that was not considered by audiophiles to be truly hi-fi.

The "compact cassette" (a Philips trademark) was introduced by the Philips Corporation at the Internationale Funkausstellung Berlin in 1963 and marketed as a device purely intended for portable speech-only dictation machines. The tape width was 1⁄8 inch (actually 0.15 inch, 3.81 mm) and tape speed was 1.875 inches (4.8 cm) per second, giving a decidedly non Hi-Fi frequency response and quite high noise levels.

Early recorders were  intended for dictation and journalists, and were typically hand-held battery-powered devices with built-in microphones and automatic gain control on recording. Tape recorder audio-quality had improved by the mid-1970s, and a cassette deck with manual level controls and VU meters became a standard component of home high-fidelity systems. Eventually the reel-to-reel recorder was completely displaced, in part because of the usage constraints presented by their large size, expense, and the inconvenience of threading and rewinding the tape reels - cassettes are more portable and can be stopped and immediately removed in the middle of playback without rewinding. Cassettes became extremely popular for automotive and other  portable music applications.  Although pre-recorded cassettes were widely available, many users would combine (dub) songs from their vinyl records or cassettes to make a new custom mixtape cassette.

In 1970, the Advent Corporation combined Dolby B noise reduction system with chromium dioxide (CrO2) tape to create the Advent Model 200, the first high-fidelity cassette deck. Dolby B uses volume companding of high frequencies to boost low-level treble information by up to 9 dB, reducing them (and the hiss) on playback.  CrO2 used different bias and equalization settings to reduce the overall noise level and extend the high frequency response. Together these allowed a usefully flat frequency response beyond 15 kHz for the first time. This deck was based on a top-loading mechanism by Nakamichi, then soon replaced by the Model 201 based on a more reliable transport made by Wollensak, a division of 3M, which was commonly used in audio/visual applications. Both featured an unusual single VU meter which could be switched between or for both channels. The Model 200 featured piano key style transport controls, with the Model 201 using the distinctive combination of a separate lever for rewind/fast forward and the large play and stop button as found on their commercial reel to reel machines of the era.

Most manufacturers adopted a standard top-loading format with piano key controls, dual VU meters, and slider level controls. There was a variety of configurations leading to the next standard format in the late 1970s, which settled on front-loading (see main picture) with cassette well on one side, dual VU meters on the other, and later dual-cassette decks with meters in the middle. Mechanical controls were replaced with electronic push buttons controlling solenoid mechanical actuators, though low cost models would retain mechanical controls. Some models could search and count gaps between songs.

Widespread use 
Cassette decks soon came into widespread use and were designed variously for professional applications, home audio systems, and for mobile use in cars, as well as portable recorders. From the mid-1970s to the late 1990s the cassette deck was the preferred music source for the automobile. Like an 8-track cartridge, it was relatively insensitive to vehicle motion, but it had reduced tape flutter, as well as the obvious advantages of smaller physical size and fast forward/rewind capability.
A major boost to the cassette's popularity came with the release of the Sony Walkman "personal" cassette player in 1979, designed specifically as a headphone-only ultra-compact "wearable" music source. Although the vast majority of such players eventually sold were not Sony products, the name "Walkman" has become synonymous with this type of device.

Cassette decks were eventually manufactured by almost every well known brand in home audio, and many in professional audio, with each company offering models of very high quality.

Performance improvements and additional features 

Cassette decks reached their pinnacle of performance and complexity by the mid-1980s.  Cassette decks from companies such as Nakamichi, Revox, and Tandberg incorporated advanced features such as multiple tape heads and dual capstan drive with separate reel motors. Auto-reversing decks became popular and were standard on most factory installed automobile decks. 

As a part of the Digital Revolution, the ongoing development of electronics technology decreased the cost of digital circuitry to the point that the technology could be applied to consumer electronics. The application of such digital electronics to cassette decks provides an early example of mechatronic design, which aims to enhance mechanical systems with electronic components in order to improve performance, increase system flexibility, or reduce cost. The inclusion of logic circuitry and solenoids into the transport and control mechanisms of cassette decks, often referred to "logic control", contrasts with earlier "piano-key" transport controls and mechanical linkages. One goal of using logic circuitry in cassette decks or recorders was to minimize equipment damage upon incorrect user input by including fail-safes into the transport and control mechanism. Such fail-safe behavior was described in a review by Julian Hirsch of a particular cassette deck featuring logic control. Some examples of fail-safe mechanisms incorporated into logic control decks include: a mechanism designed to protect internal components from damage when the tape or motor is locked, a mechanism designed to prevent the tape from being wound improperly, among others. Some logic control decks were designed to incorporate light-touch buttons or remote control, among other features marketed as being convenient. In the car stereo industry, full logic control was developed with the aim of miniaturization, so that the cassette deck would take up less dashboard space.

Three-head technology uses separate heads for recording and playback (the third of the three heads being the erase head). 
This allows different record and playback head gaps to be used. 
A narrower head gap is optimal for playback than for recording, so the head gap width of any combined record/playback head must necessarily be a compromise.  
Separate record and playback heads also allow off-the-tape monitoring during recording, permitting immediate verification of the recording quality. 
(Such machines can be identified by the presence of a "monitor" switch with positions for "tape" and "source", or similar.) 
Three-head systems were common on reel-to-reel decks, but were more difficult to implement for cassettes, 
which do not provide separate openings for record and play heads. 
Some models squeezed a monitor head into the capstan area, and others combined separate record and playback gaps into a single headshell.

The Dolby B noise reduction system was key to realizing low noise performance on slow, narrow, cassette tapes. It works by boosting the high frequencies on recording, especially low-level high-frequency sounds, with corresponding high frequency reduction on playback. This lowers the high frequency noise (hiss) by approximately 9 dB. Enhanced versions included Dolby C (in 1980) and Dolby S types. Of the three, however, only Dolby B became common on automobile decks.

Bang & Olufsen developed the HX Pro headroom extension system in conjunction with Dolby Laboratories in 1982. This was used in many higher-end decks. HX Pro reduces the high-frequency bias during recording when the signal being recorded has a high level of high frequency content. Such a signal is self-biasing. Reducing the level of the bias signal permits the desired signal to be recorded at a higher level without saturating the tape, thus increasing "headroom" or maximum recording level.

Some decks incorporated microprocessor programs to adjust tape bias and record level calibration automatically.

In later years, an "auto reverse" feature appeared that allowed the deck to play (and, in some decks, record) on both sides of the cassette without the operator having to manually remove, flip, and re-insert the cassette. 
Most auto-reverse machines use a four channel head (similar to those on multitrack recorders), with only two channels connected to the electronics at one time, one pair for each direction. 
Auto-reverse decks employ a capstan and pinch roller for each side. 
Since these use the same opening in the cassette shell normally used for the erase head, 
such decks must fit the erase head (or two, one for each direction) into the center opening in the shell along with the record/play head.

In later auto reverse machines, the "auto reverse" mechanism uses an ordinary two-track, quarter-width head, 
but operates by mechanically rotating the head 180 degrees so that the two head gaps access the other tracks of the tape. 
There is usually an azimuth adjustment screw for each position. 
Nevertheless, due to the repeated movement, the alignment (in particular, the azimuth) deviates with usage. 
Even in a machine with a four channel head, slight asymmetries in the cassette shell make it difficult to align the 
head perfectly for both directions.  

In one machine, the "Dragon", Nakamichi addressed the issue with a motor-driven automatic head alignment mechanism. 
This proved effective but very expensive. 
Later Nakamichi auto-reverse models, the RX series, was essentially a single-directional deck, 
but with an added mechanism that physically removed the cassette from the transport, flipped it over, and re-inserted it. 
Akai made a similar machine but with the mechanism and cassette laid out horizontally instead of upright.
This permitted the convenience of auto-reverse with little compromise in record or playback quality.

New tape formulations were introduced. 
Chromium dioxide (referred to as CrO2 or Type II) was the first tape designed for extended high frequency response, but it required higher bias. Later, as the IEC Type II standard was defined, a different equalization settings was also mandated to reduce hiss, thus giving up some extension at the high end of the audio spectrum. 
Better-quality cassette recorders soon appeared with a switch for the tape type. 
Later decks incorporated coded holes in the shell to autodetect the tape type. 
Chromium dioxide tape was thought to cause increased wear on the heads, so TDK and Maxell adapted cobalt-doped ferric formulations to mimic CrO2. 
Sony briefly tried FerriChrome (Type III) which claimed to combine the best of both; some people, however, stated that the reverse was true because the Cr top layer seemed to wear off quickly, reducing this type to Fe in practice. Most recent decks produce the best response and dynamic headroom with metal tapes (IEC Type IV) which require still higher bias for recording, though they will play back correctly at the II setting since the equalization is the same.

With all of these improvements, the best units could record and play the full audible spectrum from 20 Hz to over 20 kHz (although this was commonly quoted at -10, -20 or even -30 dB, not at full output level), with wow and flutter less than 0.05% and very low noise. A high-quality recording on  cassette could rival the sound of an average commercial CD, though the quality of pre-recorded cassettes has been regarded by the general public as lower than could be achieved in a quality home recording. There was a call for better sound quality in 1981, surprisingly by the head of Tower Records, Russ Solomon. At a meeting of the National Association of Recording Merchandisers (NARM) Retail Advisory Committee in Carlsbad, California, Solomon played two recordings of a Santana track; one he had recorded himself and the pre-recorded cassette release from Columbia Records. He used this technique to demonstrate what he called "the tunnel effect" in the audio range of pre-recorded cassettes and commented to the reporter Sam Sutherland, who wrote a news article printed in Billboard magazine:

"The buyer who is aware of sound quality is making his own." "They won't be satisfied with the 'tunnel effect' of prerecorded tape. And home tape deck users don't use prerecorded tapes at all." Yet, contended Solomon, while Tower's own stores show strong blank tape sales gains, its prerecorded sales have increased by only 2% to 3%. With an estimated 15% of the chain's total tape business now generated by the sales of blanks, "it would appear our added tape sales are going to TDK, Maxell and Sony, not you." he concluded. - Billboard, Vol. 93, No. 38, 26 September 1981.

Noise reduction and fidelity

A variety of noise reduction and other schemes are used to increase fidelity, with Dolby B being almost universal for both prerecorded tapes and home recording. Dolby B was designed to address the high-frequency noise inherent in cassette tapes,  and along with improvements in tape formulation it helped the cassette win acceptances as a high-fidelity medium. At the same time, Dolby B provided acceptable performance when played back on decks that lacked Dolby circuitry, meaning there was little reason not to use it if it was available.

The main alternative to Dolby was the dbx noise reduction system, which achieved a high signal-to-noise ratio, but was essentially unlistenable when played back on decks that lacked the dbx decoding circuitry.

Philips developed an alternative noise reduction system known as Dynamic Noise Limiter (DNL) which did not require the tapes to be processed during recording; this was also the basis of the later DNR noise reduction.

Dolby later introduced Dolby C and Dolby S noise reduction, which achieved higher levels of noise reduction; Dolby C became common on high-fidelity decks, but Dolby S, released when cassette sales had begun to decline, never achieved widespread use. It was only licensed for use on higher end tape decks that included dual motors, triple heads, and other refinements.

Dolby HX Pro headroom extension provided better high-frequency response by adjusting the inaudible tape bias during the recording of strong high-frequency sounds, which had a bias effect of their own. Developed by Bang & Olufsen, it did not require a decoder to play back. Since B&O held patent rights and required paying license fees, many other manufacturers refrained from using it too.

Other refinements to improve cassette performance included Tandberg's DYNEQ, Toshiba's  and Telefunken's High Com, and on some high-end decks, automatic recording bias, fine pitch adjustment and (sometimes) head azimuth adjustment such as the Tandberg TCD-330 and TCD-340A.

By the late 1980s, thanks to such improvements in the electronics, the tape material and manufacturing techniques, as well as dramatic improvements to the precision of the cassette shell, tape heads and transport mechanics, sound fidelity on equipment from the top manufacturers far surpassed the levels originally expected of the medium. On suitable audio equipment, cassettes could produce a very pleasant listening experience. High-end cassette decks could achieve 15 Hz-22 kHz±3 dB frequency response with wow and flutter below 0.022%, and a signal-to-noise ratio of up to 61 dB (for Type IV tape, without noise-reduction) . With noise reduction typical signal-to-noise figures of 70-76 dB with Dolby C, 80-86 dB with Dolby S, and 85 - 90 dB with dbx could be achieved. Many casual listeners could not tell the difference between compact cassette and compact disc.

From the early 1980s, the fidelity of prerecorded cassettes began to improve dramatically. Whereas Dolby B was already in widespread use in the 1970s, prerecorded cassettes were duplicated onto rather poor quality tape stock at (often) high speed and did not compare in fidelity to high-grade LPs. However, systems such as XDR, along with the adoption of higher-grade tape (such as chromium dioxide, but typically recorded in such a way as to play back at the normal 120 μs position), and the frequent use of Dolby HX Pro, meant that cassettes became a viable high-fidelity option, one that was more portable and required less maintenance than records. In addition, cover art, which had generally previously been restricted to a single image of the LP cover along with a minimum of text, began to be tailored to cassettes as well, with fold-out lyric sheets or librettos and fold-out sleeves becoming commonplace.

Some companies, such as Mobile Fidelity, produced audiophile cassettes in the 1980s, which were recorded on high-grade tape and duplicated on premium equipment in real time from a digital master. Unlike audiophile LPs, which continue to attract a following, these became moot after the Compact Disc became widespread.

Almost all cassette decks have an MPX filter to improve the sound quality and the tracking of the noise reduction system when recording from an FM stereo broadcast. However, in many especially cheaper decks, this filter cannot be disabled, and because of that record/playback frequency response in those decks typically is limited to 16 kHz. In other decks, the MPX filter can be switched off or on independently from the Dolby switch. On yet other decks, the filter is off by default, and an option to switch it on or off is only provided when Dolby is activated; this prevents the MPX filter from being used when it's not required.

In-car entertainment systems 
A key element of the cassette's success was its use in in-car entertainment systems, where the small size of the tape was significantly more convenient than the competing 8-track cartridge system. Cassette players in cars and for home use were often integrated with a radio receiver. In-car cassette players were the first to adopt automatic reverse ("auto-reverse") of the tape direction at each end, allowing a cassette to be played endlessly without manual intervention. Home cassette decks soon added the feature.  

Cassette tape adaptors have been developed which allow newer media players to be played through existing cassette decks, in particular those in cars which generally do not have input jacks. These units do not suffer from reception problems from FM transmitter based system to play back media players through the FM radio, though supported frequencies for FM transmitters that aren't used on commercial broadcasters in a given region (e.g. any frequency below 88.1 in the US) somewhat eliminates that problem.

Maintenance 
Cassette equipment needs regular maintenance, as cassette tape is a magnetic medium which is in physical contact with the tape head and other metallic parts of the recorder/player mechanism. Without such maintenance, the high frequency response of the cassette equipment will suffer.

One problem occurs when iron oxide (or similar) particles from the tape itself become lodged in the playback head. As a result, the tape heads will require occasional cleaning to remove such particles. The metal capstan and the rubber pinch roller can become coated with these particles, leading them to pull the tape less precisely over the head; this in turn leads to misalignment of the tape over the head azimuth, producing noticeably unclear high tones, just as if the head itself were out of alignment. Isopropyl alcohol and denatured alcohol are both suitable head-cleaning fluids. 

The heads and other metallic components in the tape path (such as spindles and capstans) may become magnetized with use, and require demagnetizing (see Cassette demagnetizer).

Decline in popularity 

Analog cassette deck sales were expected to decline rapidly with the advent of the compact disc and other digital recording technologies such as digital audio tape (DAT), MiniDisc, and the CD-R recorder drives. Philips responded with the digital compact cassette, a system which was backward-compatible with existing analog cassette recordings for playback, but it failed to garner a significant market share and was withdrawn. One reason proposed for the lack of acceptance of digital recording formats such as DAT was a fear by content providers that the ability to make very high quality copies would hurt sales of copyrighted recordings.

The rapid transition was not realized and CDs and cassettes successfully co-existed for nearly 20 years. A contributing factor may have been the inability of early CD players to reliably read discs with surface damage and offer anti-skipping features for applications where external vibration would be present, such as automotive and recreation environments.  Early CD playback equipment also tended to be expensive compared to cassette equipment of similar quality and did not offer recording capability.  Many home and portable entertainment systems supported both formats and commonly allowed the CD playback to be recorded on cassette tape. The rise of inexpensive all-solid-state portable digital music systems based on MP3, AAC and similar formats finally saw the eventual decline of the domestic cassette deck. As of 2020, Marantz, Teac, and Tascam are among the few companies still manufacturing cassette decks in relatively small quantities for professional and niche market use. By the late 1990s, automobiles were offered with entertainment systems that played both cassettes and CDs. By the end of the late 2000s, very few cars were offered with cassette decks. The last vehicle model in the United States that included a factory-installed cassette player was the 2010 Lexus SC 430. As radios became tightly integrated into dashboards, many cars lacked even standard openings that would accept aftermarket cassette player installations.

Despite the decline in the production of cassette decks, these products are still valued by some. Many blind and elderly people find the newest digital technologies very difficult to use compared to the cassette format. Cassette tapes are not vulnerable to scratching from handling (though the exposed magnetic tape is vulnerable to stretching from poking), and play from where they were last stopped (though some modern MP3 players offer savestating electronically). Cassette tapes can also be recorded multiple times (though some solid-state digital recorders are now offering that function).

Today, cassette decks are not considered by most people to be either the most versatile or highest fidelity sound recording devices available, as even very inexpensive CD or digital audio players can reproduce a wide frequency range with no speed variations. Many current budget-oriented cassette decks lack a tape selector to set proper bias and equalization settings to take best advantage of the extended high end of Type II [High Bias] and Type IV [Metal Bias] tapes.

Cassettes remain popular for audio-visual applications. Some CD recorders, particularly those intended for business use, incorporate a cassette deck to allow both formats for recording meetings, church sermons, and books on tape.

References

External links

 Audio Asylum Tape Trail – A discussion forum of interest to those involved in cassette technology.
Vintage Cassette Decks - A collection of Vintage cassette decks of all brands.

Audio players
Recording devices
Tape recording
1963 in technology
Audiovisual introductions in 1963
Products introduced in 1963